Mexican Brigadier General Antonio de León (born 4 June 1794) commanded the Oaxaca National Guard during the Mexican–American War (1846-1848).

Military career 
In the aftermath of the Battle of Cerro Gordo, Gen. Antonio de León arrived with the national guard of Oaxaca to reinforce General Santa Anna. Although they did not engage in combat at Cerro Gordo, Santa Anna would use the new brigade to help rebuild and replenish his army.

Antonio de León played a crucial role in the Battle of Molino del Rey. "With great bravado, León called on the soldiers of the "Patria" Battalion to attention on the eve of the battle and issued a challenge for "those to take a step forward amongst you who are prepared to die with me for our motherland because we shall surely not survive the coming battle."

Death 
Seen at the forefront of the Battle of Molino del Rey, General De León was shot and killed during the heat of the battle. Studies state that before his death it was said that León's last words in consciousness were uttered to Lieutenant-Colonel Miguel María de Echegaray of the 6th Light Infantry Regiment,
"Haga lo imposible por nuestra patria, que ella sabrá recompensar sus servicios."

References

1794 births
1847 deaths
Mexican generals
Mexican military personnel killed in the Mexican–American War
Military personnel from Oaxaca
19th-century Mexican military personnel